Polar cell may refer to:
Polar cells, a constituent of atmospheric circulation
Polar body, a smaller cell by-product of egg formation in some animal species